Marlon José Medina García (born 6 March 1985) is a Nicaraguan footballer who currently plays for Deportivo Ocotal in the Primera División de Nicaragua.

Club career
Medina started his career at hometown club Real Estelí and joined Deportivo Ocotal in summer 2013.

International career
Medina made his debut for Nicaragua in a January 2009 UNCAF Nations Cup match against El Salvador in which he came on as a late sub and immediately scored. He has, as of December 2013, earned a total of 12 caps, scoring 1 goal. He has represented his country at the 2009 and 2013 UNCAF Nations Cups as well as at the 2009 CONCACAF Gold Cup.

International goals
Scores and results list Honduras' goal tally first.

References

External links
 

1985 births
Living people
People from Estelí Department
Association football midfielders
Nicaraguan men's footballers
Nicaragua international footballers
2009 UNCAF Nations Cup players
2009 CONCACAF Gold Cup players
2013 Copa Centroamericana players
Real Estelí F.C. players